Haplogroup I (M170) is a Y-chromosome DNA haplogroup. It is a subgroup of haplogroup IJ, which itself is a derivative of the haplogroup IJK. Subclades I1 and I2 can be found in most present-day European populations, with peaks in some Northern European and Southeastern European countries.

Haplogroup I appears to have arisen in Europe, so far being found in Palaeolithic sites throughout Europe (Fu 2016), but not outside it. It diverged from common ancestor IJ* about 43,000 years B.P. (Karafet 2008). Early evidence for haplogroup J has been found in the Caucasus and Iran (Jones 2015, Fu 2016). In addition, living examples of the precursor Haplogroup IJ* have been found only in Iran, among the Mazandarani and ethnic Persians from Fars. This may indicate that IJ originated in South West Asia.

Haplogroup I has been found in multiple individuals belonging to the Gravettian culture. The Gravettians expanded westwards from the far corner of Eastern Europe, likely Russia, to Central Europe. They are associated with a genetic cluster that is normally called the Věstonice cluster.

Origins

Available evidence suggests that I-M170 was preceded into areas in which it would later become dominant by haplogroups K2a (K-M2308) and C1 (Haplogroup C-F3393). K2a and C1 have been found in the oldest sequenced male remains from Western Eurasia (dating from circa 45,000 to 35,000 years BP), such as: Ust'-Ishim man (modern west Siberia) K2a*, Oase 1 (Romania) K2a*, Kostenki 14 (south west Russia) C1b, and Goyet Q116-1 (Belgium) C1a. The oldest I-M170 found is that of an individual known as Krems WA3 (lower Austria), dating from circa 33,000-24,000 BP. At the same site, two twin boys were also found, both were assigned to haplogroup I*.

Haplogroup IJ was in the Middle East and/or Europe about 40,000 years ago. The TMRCA (time to most recent common ancestor) for I-M170 was estimated by Karafet and colleagues in 2008 to be 22,200 years ago, with a confidence interval between 15,300 and 30,000 years ago. This would make the founding event of I-M170 approximately contemporaneous with the Last Glacial Maximum (LGM), which lasted from 26,500 years ago until approximately 19,500 years ago. TMRCA is an estimate of the time of subclade divergence. Rootsi and colleagues in 2004 also note two other dates for a clade, age of STR variation, and time since population divergence. These last two dates are roughly associated, and occur somewhat after subclade divergence. For Haplogroup I-M170 they estimate time to STR variation as 24,000 ±7,100 years ago and time to population divergence as 23,000 ±7,700 years ago. These estimates are consistent with those of Karafet 2008 cited above. However, Underhill and his colleagues calculate the time to subclade divergence of I1 and I2 to be 28,400 ±5,100 years ago, although they calculate the STR variation age of I1 at only 8,100 ±1,500 years ago.

Semino (2000) speculated that the initial dispersion of this population corresponds to the diffusion of the Gravettian culture. Later the haplogroup, along with two cases of Haplogroup C, was found in human remains belonging to the previously mentioned Gravettian culture and in individuals of the Magdalenian and Azilian cultures. Rootsi and colleagues in 2004 suggested that each of the ancestral populations now dominated by a particular subclade of Haplogroup I-M170 experienced an independent population expansion immediately after the Last Glacial Maximum.

The five known cases of Haplogroup I from Upper Paleolithic European human remains make it one of the most frequent haplogroup from that period. In 2016, the 31,210–34,580-year-old remains of a hunter-gatherer from Paglicci Cave, Apulia, Italy were found to carry I-M170. So far, only Haplogroup F* and Haplogroup C1b have been documented, once each, on older remains in Europe. I2 subclade of I-M170 is the main haplogroup found on male remains in Mesolithic Europe, until circa 6,000 BCE, when mass migration into Europe of Anatolian farmers carrying Y-DNA G2a happened.

Due to the arrival of so-called Early European Farmers (EEFs), I-M170 is outnumbered by Haplogroup G among Neolithic European remains and by Haplogroup R in later remains.

The earliest documentation of I1 is from Neolithic Hungary, although it must have separated from I2 at an earlier point in time.

In one instance, haplogroup I was found far from Europe, among 2,000-year-old remains from Mongolia.

It would seem to be that separate waves of population movement impacted Southeastern Europe. The role of the Balkans as a long-standing corridor to Europe from Anatolia and/or the Caucasus is shown by the common phylogenetic origins of both haplogroups I and J in the parent haplogroup IJ (M429). This common ancestry suggests that the subclades of IJ entered the Balkans from Anatolia or the Caucasus, some time before the Last Glacial Maximum. I and J were subsequently distributed in Asia and Europe in a disjunctive phylogeographic pattern typical of "sibling" haplogroups. A natural geographical corridor like the Balkans is likely to have been used later by members of other subclades of IJ, as well as other haplogroups, including those associated with Early European Farmers.

The existence of Haplogroup IJK – the ancestor of both haplogroups IJ and K (M9) – and its evolutionary distance from other subclades of Haplogroup F (M89), supports the inference that haplogroups IJ and K both arose in Southwestern Asia. Living carriers of F* and IJ* have been reported from the Iranian Plateau.

Distribution
Frequencies of Haplogroup I:

Subgroups

The subclades of Haplogroup I-M170 with their defining mutations, as of 2011. Up-to-date phylogenetic trees listing all currently known subclades of I can be found at Y-Full and FamilyTreeDNA

I-M170 ( L41, M170, M258, P19_1, P19_2, P19_3, P19_4, P19_5, P38, P212, Page123, U179) Middle East, Caucasus, Europe.
I-M253 Haplogroup I1 (L64, L75, L80, L81, L118, L121/S62, L123, L124/S64, L125/S65, L157, L186, L187, M253, M307.2/P203.2, M450/S109, P30, P40, S63, S66, S107, S108, S110, S111) Typical of populations of Scandinavia and Northwest Europe, with a moderate distribution throughout Eastern Europe In Anatolia at 1%
I1a   DF29/S438
I1a1   CTS6364/Z2336
I1a1a   M227
I1a1a1   M72
I1a1b   L22/S142
I1a1b1   P109
I1a1b2   L205
I1a1b3   L287
I1a1b3a   L258/S335
I1a1b3a1   L296
I1a1b4   L300/S241
I1a1b5   L813/Z719
I1a2    S244/Z58
I1a2a   S246/Z59
I1a2a1   S337/Z60, S439/Z61, Z62
I1a2a1a   Z140, Z141
I1a2a1a1   Z2535
I1a2a1a1a   L338
I1a2a1a2   F2642
I1a2a1b   Z73
I1a2a1c   L573
I1a2a1d   L1248
I1a2a1d1   L803
I1a2a2   Z382
I1a2b   S296/Z138, Z139
I1a2b1   Z2541
I1a3   S243/Z63
I1a3a   L1237
I1b   Z131 
I-M438 Haplogroup I2 L68/PF3781/S329, M438/P215/PF3853/S31
I2a   L460/PF3647/S238
I2a1   P37.2
I2a1a   L158/PF4073/S433, L159.1/S169.1, M26/PF4056
I2a1a1   L160/PF4013
I2a1b   L178/S328, M423
I2a1b1   L161.1/S185
I2a1b2   L621/S392
I2a1b2a1a L147.2 
I2a1c   L233/S183
I2a2   L35/PF3862/S150, L37/PF6900/S153, L181, M436/P214/PF3856/S33, P216/PF3855/S30, P217/PF3854/S23, P218/S32
I2a2a   L34/PF3857/S151, L36/S152, L59, L368, L622, M223, P219/PF3859/S24, P220/S119, P221/PF3858/S120, P222/PF3861/U250/S118, P223/PF3860/S117, Z77
I2a2a1   CTS616, CTS9183
I2a2a1a   M284
I2a2a1a1   L1195
I2a2a1a1a   L126/S165, L137/S166, L369
I2a2a1a1b   L1193
I2a2a1b   L701, L702
I2a2a1b1   P78
I2a2a1b2   L699, L703
I2a2a1b2a   L704
I2a2a1c   Z161
I2a2a1c1   L801/S390
I2a2a1c1a   CTS1977
I2a2a1c1a1   P95
I2a2a1c1b   CTS6433
I2a2a1c1b1   Z78
I2a2a1c1b1a   L1198
I2a2a1c1b1a1   Z190
I2a2a1c1b1a1a   S434/Z79
I2a2a1c2   L623, L147.4
I2a2a1d   L1229
I2a2a1d1   Z2054
I2a2a1d1a   L812/S391
I2a2a1d2   L1230
I2a2a2   L1228
I2a2b   L38/S154, L39/S155, L40/S156, L65.1/S159.1, L272.3
I2a2b1   L533
I2b   L415, L416, L417
I2c   L596/PF6907/S292, L597/S333
Note that the naming of some of the subgroups has changed, as new markers have been identified, and the sequence of mutations has become clearer.

I-M170
The composite subclade I-M170 contains individuals directly descended from the earliest members of Haplogroup I, bearing none of the subsequent mutations which identify the remaining named subclades.

Several I* individuals, who do not fall into any known subclades, have been found among the Lak people of Dagestan, at a rate of (3/21), as well as Turkey (8/741), Adygea in the Caucasus (2/138) and Iraq (1/176), even though I-M170 occurs at only very low frequencies among modern populations of these regions as a whole. This is consistent with the belief that the haplogroup first appeared in South West Eurasia.

There are also high frequencies of Haplogroup I* among the Andalusians (3/103), French (4/179), Slovenians (2/55), Tabassarans (1/30), and Saami (1/35).

(Neither study from which the above figures were drawn excluded the present I2-M438 clade as a whole, but only certain subclades, so these presumed cases I* may possibly belong to I2.)

A living Hazara male from Afghanistan has also been found to carry I*, with all known subclades of both I1 (M253) and I2 (M438) ruled out.

I1-M253

Haplogroup I1-M253 (M253, M307, P30, P40) displays a very clear frequency gradient, with a peak frequency of approximately 35% among the populations of southern Norway, southwestern Sweden, and Denmark, and rapidly decreasing frequencies toward the edges of the historically Germanic-influenced world. A notable exception is Finland, where frequency in West Finns is up to 40%, and in certain provinces like Satakunta more than 50%. I1 is believed to have become common as a result of a founder effect during the Nordic Bronze Age, and subsequently spread throughout Europe during the Migration Period when Germanic tribes migrated from southern Scandinavia and northern Germany to other places in Europe.

Outside Fennoscandia, distribution of Haplogroup I1-M253 is closely correlated with that of Haplogroup I2a2-M436; but among Scandinavians (including both Germanic and Uralic peoples of the region) nearly all the Haplogroup I-M170 Y-chromosomes are I1-M253.  Another characteristic of the Scandinavian I1-M253 Y-chromosomes is their rather low haplotype diversity (STR diversity): a greater variety of Haplogroup I1-M253 Y-chromosomes has been found among the French and Italians, despite the much lower overall frequency of Haplogroup I1-M253 among the modern French and Italian populations. This, along with the structure of the phylogenetic tree of I1-M253 strongly suggests that most living I1 males are the descendants of an initially small group of reproductively successful men who lived in Scandinavia during the Nordic Bronze Age.

I2-M438

Haplogroup I2-M438, previously I1b, may have originated in southern Europe – it is now found at its highest frequencies in the western Balkans and Sardinia – some 15,000–17,000 years ago and developed into three main subgroups : I2-M438*, I2a-L460, I2b-L415 and I2c-L596.

I2a1a-M26

Haplogroup I2a1a-M26 is notable for its strong presence in Sardinia. Haplogroup I-M170 comprises approximately 40% of all patrilines among the Sardinians, and I2a1a-M26 is the predominant type of I among them.

Haplogroup I2a1a-M26 is practically absent east of France and Italy, while it is found at low but significant frequencies outside of Sardinia in the Balearic Islands, Castile-León, the Basque Country, the Pyrenees, southern and western France, and parts of the Maghreb in North Africa, Great Britain, and Ireland. Haplogroup I2a1a-M26 appears to be the only subclade of Haplogroup I-M170 found among the Basques, but appears to be found at somewhat higher frequencies among the general populations of Castile-León in Spain and Béarn in France than among the population of ethnic Basques. The M26 mutation is found in native males inhabiting every geographic region where megaliths may be found, including such far-flung and culturally disconnected regions as the Canary Islands, the Balearic Isles, Corsica, Ireland, and Sweden.

The distribution of I2a1a-M26 also mirrors that of the Atlantic Bronze Age cultures, which indicates a potential spread via the obsidian trade or a regular maritime exchange of some of metallurgical products.

I2a1b-M423

Haplogroup I2a1b-M423 is the most frequent Y-chromosome haplogroup I-M170 in Central and Eastern European populations, reaching its peak in the Western Balkans, most notably in Dalmatia (50–60%) and Bosnia-Herzegovina (up to 71%, avg. 40-50%). Its subclade I-L161 has greater variance in Ireland and Great Britain, but overall frequency is very low (2–3%), while subclade I-L162 has the highest variance and also high concentration in Eastern Europe (Ukraine, Southeastern Poland, Belarus).

I2a2-M436

The distribution of Haplogroup I2a2-M436 (M436/P214/S33, P216/S30, P217/S23, P218/S32) is closely correlated to that of Haplogroup I1 except in Fennoscandia, which suggests that it was probably harbored by at least one of the Paleolithic refuge populations that also harbored Haplogroup I1-M253; the lack of correlation between the distributions of I1-M253 and I2a2-M436 in Fennoscandia may be a result of Haplogroup I2a2-M436's being more strongly affected in the earliest settlement of this region by founder effects and genetic drift due to its rarity, as Haplogroup I2a2-M436 comprises less than 10% of the total Y-chromosome diversity of all populations outside of Lower Saxony. Haplogroup I2a2-M436 has been found in over 4% of the population only in Germany, the Netherlands, Belgium, Denmark, England (not including Cornwall), Scotland, and the southern tips of Sweden and Norway in Northwest Europe; the provinces of Normandy, Maine, Anjou, and Perche in northwestern France; the province of Provence in southeastern France; the regions of Tuscany, Umbria, and Latium in Italy; and Moldavia and the area around Russia's Ryazan Oblast and Republic of Mordovia in Eastern Europe. One subclade of Haplogroup I2a2-M436, namely I2a2a1a1-M284, has been found almost exclusively among the population of Great Britain, which has been taken to suggest that the clade may have a very long history in that island. It is notable, however, that the distributions of Haplogroup I1-M253 and Haplogroup I2a2-M436 seem to correlate fairly well with the extent of historical influence of Germanic peoples. The punctual presence of both haplogroups at a low frequency in the area of the historical regions of Bithynia and Galatia in Turkey may be related to the Varangian Guard or rather suggests a connection with the ancient Gauls of Thrace, several tribes of which are recorded to have immigrated to those parts of Anatolia at the invitation of Nicomedes I of Bithynia. This suggestion is supported by recent genetic studies regarding Y-DNA Haplogroup I2b2-L38 have concluded that there was some Late Iron Age migration of Celtic La Tène people, through Belgium, to the British Isles including north-east Ireland.

Haplogroup I2a2-M436 also occurs among approximately 1% of Sardinians, and in Hazaras from Afghanistan at 3%.

Specifications of mutation
The technical details of U179 are:

Nucleotide change (rs2319818): G to A
Position (base pair): 275
Total size (base pairs): 220
Forward 5′→ 3′: 
Reverse 5′→ 3′:

Height
This haplogroup reaches its maximum frequency in the Western Balkans (with the highest concentration of I2 in present-day Herzegovina). It may be associated with unusually tall males, since those in the Dinaric Alps have been reported to be the tallest in the world, with an average male height of the range – in the cantons of Bosnia,  in Sarajevo, – in the cantons of Herzegovina. A 2014 study examining the correlation between Y-DNA haplogroups and height found a correlation between the haplogroups I1, R1b-U106, I2a1b-M423 and tall males. The study featured the measured average heights of young German, Swedish, Dutch, Danish, Serbian and Bosnian men. The German male average height was 180.2 cm, the Swedish men were on average 181.4 cm, the Dutch men were 183.8 cm, the Danish men were 180.6 cm, the Serbians were 180.9 cm, and men from Herzegovina were 185.2 centimeters on average.

See also
Haplogroup
Human Y-chromosome DNA haplogroups
Haplogroup I1 (Y-DNA)
Haplogroup I2 (Y-DNA)
Late Glacial Maximum
Aurignacian
Proto-Indo-Europeans
Gravettian

Notes

Bennett, E.A., Prat, S., Péan, S., Crépin, L., Yanevich, A., Puaud, S., ... & Geigl, E. M. (2019). The origin of the Gravettians: genomic evidence from a 36,000-year-old Eastern European. BioRxiv, 685404.

The Genographic Project, National Geographic, Atlas of the Human Journey
ISOGG, Y-DNA Haplogroup I and its Subclades

References

External links

Phylogenetic tree and distribution maps
Y-DNA Haplogroup I-M170 and Its Subclades from the International Society of Genetic Genealogy (ISOGG)of 2013
Phylogeography of Y-Chromosome Haplogroup I
Frequency Distributions of Y-DNA Haplogroup I and its subclades – with Video Tutorial
Frequency and Variance  of I1b (now considered I2a2-M26)
Map of 'I1a' (now considered I-M253)
Map of 'I1b' (now considered I2a-P37.2)
Map of 'I1c' (now considered I2b-M223)
Rescalled  Haplogroup I Tree (K. Nordtvedt 2011).

Projects
I Project at FTDNA
I1 Project at FTDNA
I2* Project at FTDNA
I2a project at FTDNA
I2b project at FTDNA
I2b2 L38+ project at FTDNA
The Scandinavian yDNA Genealogical Project at FTDNA
The Finland Genealogical Project at FTDNA

Other
Study of Y-Haplogroup I and Modal Haplotypes
The Y Chromosome Consortium (YCC)
Example haplotypes from I1* "y cluster"
YCC Haplogroup I page – I1a (now considered I-M253), I1b (now considered I-P37.2) and I1c (now considered I-M223)
Haplo-I Subclade Predictor
Spread of Haplogroup I, from National Geographic
I2b2 Y-DNA found in Bronze Age skeletons of Lichtenstein Cave
Haplogroup I-L38 (I2b2) In Search of the Origin of I-L38 (aka I2b2)

I